Pearce, Arizona, and Sunsites, Arizona, are adjacent unincorporated communities  in the Sulphur Springs Valley of Cochise County, Arizona, United States. The two communities are often referred to as Pearce–Sunsites, Pearce/Sunsites, or Pearce Sunsites.

Pearce is located between the Cochise Stronghold, Chiricahua National Monument, and the winter Sandhill Crane refuge of Whitewater Draw making it popular for birders, history buffs, hikers, and climbers alike.  At 4,400 feet of elevation, the area is also known for its milder summers which make it ideal for quality grapes and vineyards (recognized as an American Viticultural Area).

Pearce is best known as a historic ghost town. Sunsites, founded in 1961, adjoins Pearce, and the Sunizona and Richland developments are nearby. All of these communities share the Pearce, Arizona post office and ZIP code, 85625. The 85625 ZIP Code Tabulation Area, which includes the four communities named plus a large surrounding rural area, had a population of 2104 at the 2000 census. and 1983 in the 2010 census. The Pearce–Sunsites economy is based on retirees and tourism.

Fittsburg was the site of the Commonwealth Mine and is located about one mile east of Pearce.

History
Pearce is a mining ghost town named for  Cornishman James Pearce, miner and cattleman, who discovered gold nearby at what became the Commonwealth Mine in 1894. The Pearce Post Office was established on March 6, 1896. The railroad station opened in 1903. By 1919, Pearce had a population of 1,500. The town declined in the 1930s and became almost a ghost town in the late 1940s when the mine closed for the last time.

The Commonwealth Mine became one of Arizona's major silver producers. Over 1,000,000 tons of ore were produced from 1895 to 1942. There are about 20 miles of underground workings. The mine produced about $8 million worth of silver and $2.5 million in gold at a time when silver was priced around 50 cents an ounce, and gold was $20 an ounce.

Sunsites was established in the 1950s and 1960s by New York lawyer Joseph Timan and his Horizon Land Company.

Historic sites
Pearce is the home of two properties on the National Register of Historic Places. The Old Pearce General Store opened in 1896. The store remained open as a tourist attraction after Pearce (almost) died, and remains open in 2009. Our Lady of Victory Catholic Church was added to the National Register of Historic Places in 2004. There are a number of other historic structures still extant in and around Pearce, some still in use, others in ruins.

Climate
Pearce has a cold semi-arid climate (Köppen: BSk) with cool winters and hot summers.

Notable people
 Burt Alvord, late 19th-century lawman in Pearce
 Daniel Barringer (geologist), part owner of Commonwealth Mine
 Bill Downing, a notorious late 19th-century outlaw
 Edward Landers Drew, Pinal County deputy sheriff buried in the Pearce Cemetery
 R. A. F. Penrose, Jr., part owner of Commonwealth Mine
 Effie Anderson Smith, Arizona Impressionist painter of landscapes, and wife of mine manager A.Y. Smith

See also

 Cochise County in the Old West
 Shootout at Wilson Ranch
 List of Old West gunfights

References

Further reading

Sources and external links

 Pearce Sunsites Chamber of Commerce
 Google map of Pearce–Sunsites
 Old Pearce Mercantile
 Pearce and Fittsburg ghost towns, includes photo gallery
 Pearce ghost town

1896 establishments in Arizona Territory
Cemeteries in Arizona
Former populated places in Cochise County, Arizona
Ghost towns in Arizona
Mining communities in Arizona
Populated places established in 1896